Giancarlo Bercellino (born 9 October 1941) is a former Italian footballer who played as a defender. He is sometimes referred to as Bercellino I, because his brother Silvino Bercellino was also a football player. His father Teresio Bercellino also played football professionally in the Serie A.

Club career
At club level Bercellino was most famous for his time with Juventus with whom he played over 200 games with in all competitions between 1961 and 1969, scoring 14 goals, and winning a Serie A title and the Coppa Italia. He also played for Alessandria, Brescia and Lazio.

International career
At international level, Barcellino represented Italy on six occasions between 1965 and 1968, and was a member of the team that won UEFA Euro 1968 on home soil.

Style of play
Bercellino began his career as a centre-forward in his youth, who was known for his dynamism, energy, excellent dribbling skills and powerful and accurate striking ability, which also made him an accurate set-piece and penalty taker. He was later deployed as a defender, where he excelled due to his consistency and tenacious style of play, which made him effective in defending one on one situations. In this new role defensive, he stood out for his physical strength, ability in the air, and his anticipation, although he was also known for his technique and goalscoring ability from defence.

Honours

Player

Club
Juventus
Serie A: 1966–67
Coppa Italia: 1964–65

International
Italy
UEFA European Football Championship: 1968

References

1941 births
Living people
Italian footballers
Italy international footballers
U.S. Alessandria Calcio 1912 players
Juventus F.C. players
Brescia Calcio players
S.S. Lazio players
UEFA Euro 1968 players
UEFA European Championship-winning players
Serie A players
Sportspeople from the Province of Vercelli
Association football defenders
Mediterranean Games gold medalists for Italy
Mediterranean Games medalists in football
Footballers from Piedmont
Competitors at the 1963 Mediterranean Games
People from Gattinara